"Sarah" is a song written and recorded by Mauro Scocco for his 1988 album Mauro Scocco. The song charted at Svensktoppen for 14 weeks between 7 October 1988-22 January 1989, topping the chart. The single was released in 1988, and topped the Swedish singles chart. "Sarah" also became the most popular Trackslistan song of 1988.

In the TV program Pluras kök, aired in April 2011, actress Elin Klinga told she was the inspiration for the song. On 20 May 2011, Mauro Scocco confirmed this for P3 Populär.

Music video 

Parts of the music video were shot at the 7 Eleven store at the corner near Valhallavägen and Artillerigatan. Other parts were recorded at Jungfrugatan in Östermalm, where "Sarah" is seen in one of the French windows at Jungfrugatan 52.

Appearing in the video, except for Scocco, are also Catarina Svensk (as "Sarah"), Orup and Johan Kinde.

Charts

Other versions 
At Dansbandskampen 2008 the song was performed by Scotts. The song also appeared on the 2008 Scotts album På vårt sätt.

References

External links 

 

1988 singles
1988 songs
Number-one singles in Sweden
Swedish-language songs
Scotts (band) songs
Songs written by Mauro Scocco
Music videos shot in Stockholm